Redza Piyadasa was a Malaysian artist, art critic and art historian.

Piyadasa was born in 1939 in Kuantan, the capital of Pahang, in a family of Sinhalese origin. Initially he followed a study at the Malaysia Teacher's College in Brinsford Lodge to become a teacher. Afterwards, he followed an art study at the Hornsey College of Art in Crouch End, London, on the basis of a scholarship of the Malaysian government. Here he obtained his degree in 1967. Consequently, he returned to Malaysia, where he started to work as a teacher at the School for Art and Design, which shortly before was founded as a part of the Universiti Teknologi MARA.

Piyadasa dedicated his life to art, in the sense of focusing on art theory, as well as performing himself. As an artist he produced visual artwork, like paintings, installations and collages. By means of his publications in Malaysian as well as in English, he importantly filled up a vacuum of the sixties and seventies. He initiated a hardly existing debate in this time in his country on art critic and history.

Piyadasa was interested mainly in Asiatic art which he linked with traditional art in Asia, as well as with contemporary art in the West. His critics offered an answer on the neo-nationalist, Islamic and global currents in Malaysia. Great part of his live, during two decades, he worked on collages called Malaysia Series. In 1998 he was honored with a Prince Claus Award from the Netherlands. Piyadasa died on May 7, 2007, in Selayang.

Expositions (selection) 
1987: Baba family
1978: A matter of time

References 

Malaysian artists
Malaysian painters
Modern painters
Art critics
1939 births
People from Pahang
Malaysian people of Sri Lankan descent
2007 deaths